Yeom Hyeon-su (born April 20, 1984), better known as Yumdda, is a South Korean rapper and former VJ for MTV Korea.

On November 25, 2020, he and former Illionaire Records artist The Quiett established their new record label Daytona Entertainment, after the closure of Illionaire Records.

Discography

Studio albums

Charted songs

Filmography

Television

Awards and nominations

References 

1984 births
Living people
South Korean male rappers
South Korean television presenters